Jennifer Rubin is a policy analyst and professor of public policy at King's College London.Page not found... She was the Executive Chair at ESRC and the Champion for Equality, Diversity and Inclusion at UK Research and Innovation from 2017 to 2020. She sits on the board of the Office for Strategic Coordination of Health Research She is currently the chief scientific officer at the Home office.

References

Living people
Year of birth missing (living people)